West Hall may refer to: 

West Hall, Kew, a 17th-century house in the London Borough of Richmond upon Thames
West Hall, Longburton, Grade I-listed mansion in Longburton, Dorset

United States
West Hall (Kansas State University), a dormitory at Kansas State University
West Hall (Valdosta State University), building at Valdosta State University, Valdosta, Georgia
West Hall (Rensselaer Polytechnic Institute), a historic building at RPI in Troy, New York
West Hall (Texas Tech University), a historic building at Texas Tech in Lubbuck, Texas
West Hall High School, a high school in Oakwood, Georgia
Waldschmidt Hall, originally West Hall, at the University of Portland in Oregon
West Hall (Tufts University), a historic dormitory at Tufts University
West Hall (Western Kentucky University), listed on the National Register of Historic Places in Warren County, Kentucky
West Sitting Hall, in the White House, Washington, D.C.

Architectural disambiguation pages